Nawaf Al-Mutairi (born September 28, 1982) is a Kuwaiti retired football player. Al-Mutairi was a midfielder in the National team, and also played in the Kuwaiti Sports Club Team known as the Qadsia Sporting Club. He currently works as a Lieutenant colonel in the Kuwaiti Army.

External links

Living people
1982 births
Kuwaiti footballers
Qadsia SC players
2004 AFC Asian Cup players
Association football midfielders
Kuwait international footballers
Al Salmiya SC players
Kuwait Premier League players
Al-Nasr SC (Kuwait) players